Adam Jozef Przybek (born 2 April 2000) is a professional footballer who plays as a goalkeeper for Stevenage. Born in England, he has represented Wales at youth international level.

Club career

West Bromwich Albion
Przybek began his career with West Bromwich Albion. He joined non-league side Worcester City on loan in March 2018 as cover, making 5 appearances. In October 2018, he joined Gloucester City on loan, making five league appearances before returning to West Brom. He spent a third loan spell away from the club making 7 appearances with Rushall Olympic.

Ipswich Town
After being released by West Brom in 2019, he signed for League One side Ipswich Town on a two-year contract. He made his professional debut for the side on 4 December 2019 in an EFL Trophy match against Peterborough United. The match ended in a 1–1 draw before Ipswich went on to win a penalty shootout during which Przybek saved two penalties.

Przybek joined Braintree Town on a month long youth loan in October 2020.

On 4 December 2020, Przybek joined Concord Rangers on loan until 3 January 2021.

On 21 January 2021, Przybek joined National League side Chesterfield on loan until the end of the season.

In April 2021, Ipswich announced that Przybek would be released at the end of the 2020–21 season following the end of his contract.

Wycombe Wanderers
He moved to Wycombe Wanderers in July 2021 but was released by the club in May 2022.

Walsall
On 21 June 2022, Przybek joined League Two side Walsall on a free transfer, signing a one-year deal. He made his Walsall debut on 30 August 2022 in the EFL Trophy 1-0 defeat to West Ham united Under-21s. Przybek's Walsall contract was cancelled by mutual agreement on 2 November 2022. He made his Stevenage debut on 15 February 2023 as a half-time substitute in the League Two 2-2 draw against Newport County.

Stevenage
Przybek joined Stevenage on 6 February 2023.

International career
Born in England, Przybek has represented both England and Wales at international level. Przybek played for England and Wales at under-15 and under-16 level before switching allegiance to Wales. He played for the Wales under-19 side in 2016 and the under-20 side from 2016 to 2019.

He received his first call up to the Wales U21 squad in August 2019 for European Championship qualifiers. He made his debut for the Wales U21 side on 11 October 2019, starting in a 1–2 loss to Moldova U21 in a 2021 UEFA European Under-21 Championship qualifier.

Personal life
Przybek is of Polish descent.

Career statistics

References

External links

2000 births
Living people
Welsh footballers
Wales youth international footballers
Wales under-21 international footballers
English footballers
England youth international footballers
Welsh people of Polish descent
English people of Polish descent
Association football goalkeepers
Ipswich Town F.C. players
Wycombe Wanderers F.C. players
West Bromwich Albion F.C. players
Worcester City F.C. players
Gloucester City A.F.C. players
Rushall Olympic F.C. players
Braintree Town F.C. players
Concord Rangers F.C. players
Chesterfield F.C. players
Stevenage F.C. players
Southern Football League players
National League (English football) players
Walsall F.C. players